Carlos Martín Karpan (born June 3, 1974 in Villa del Parque, Buenos Aires, Argentina) is an Argentine-Colombian actor, notable for playing a villain in the telenovela El Cuerpo del Deseo and Te Voy a Enseñar a Querer.

Personal life
He has a son, Luciano, born on July 8, 2008, with actress Zharick León. His father was an actor and his mother was a housewife.

Filmography

Television 
 El final del paraíso (2019) - Salvatore
 La Viuda Negra ll (2016)-Ferguson
 El secretario (2011) - Félix Armando Segura
 Clase ejecutiva (2010) - Julian Coronado
 Kdabra (2009–2011) - Daniel Trejo (Astronauta)
 El Rostro de Analía (2008–2009) - Daniel Montiel
 Nuevo Rico Nuevo Pobre (2007 - July 2008) - Andres Ferreira
 La Viuda de Blanco (2006) - Amador Blanco
 El Cuerpo del Deseo (2005) - Andrés Corona
 Te Voy a Enseñar a Querer (2004-2005) - Luis Carlos López
 El auténtico Rodrigo Leal (2003) - Rodrigo Leal
 Máximo corazón (2002) - Roberto Gómez 'El Facha'
 ¿Y dónde está el bebé? (2002)
 Amor latino (2000) - Leonel Díaz
 Los buscas de siempre (2000)
 Calientes (2000) - Rey
 Primicias (2000)
 Signos (2000)
 No muertos (1999) - Natan Balasko
 Como vos & yo (1998) - Manuel Andrade
 Gasoleros (1998) - Rubén
 La nocturna (1998)
 Momentos robados (1997)
 De corazón (1997) - Nicolás
 Sueltos (1996) - Mariano
 Flores amarillas en la ventana (1996) - Ricardo

References

External links

Living people
1974 births
Male actors from Buenos Aires
Argentine male telenovela actors